Pulcharopa is a monotypic genus of pinwheel snails that is endemic to Australia's Lord Howe Island in the Tasman Sea. 

The only species is P. plesa, also known as the fiery-bangled pinwheel snail.

Description
The ear-shaped shell of mature snails is 1.9–2.5 mm in height, with a diameter of 3.5–4.2 mm, discoidal with a very low spire, widely spaced ribs and impressed sutures. It is orange-brown with zigzag, cream-coloured flammulations (flame-like markings). The umbilicus is moderately wide. The aperture is ovately lunate. The animal is unknown as it has never been collected alive.

Distribution and habitat
The snail is known only from the lowlands of the northern part of the island.

References

 
Charopidae
Monotypic gastropod genera
Gastropods of Lord Howe Island